Dissoleucas is a genus of beetles belonging to the family Anthribidae.

The species of this genus are found in Europe.

Species:
 Dissoleucas brevirostris Wolfrum, 1953 
 Dissoleucas niveirostris (Fabricius, 1798)

References

Anthribidae